Martin Stadium at Dr. Robert M. Edens Field is a soccer-specific stadium on the campus of Presbyterian College in Clinton, South Carolina. The stadium hosts the Presbyterian Blue Hose men's and women's soccer teams. The facility opened in 2000, and sits 400. 

The stadium will host the 2018 final of the Big South Conference Men's Soccer Tournament.

References

External links 
 Edens Stadium

Sports venues in Laurens County, South Carolina
Presbyterian Blue Hose
Soccer venues in South Carolina
College soccer venues in the United States
2000 establishments in South Carolina
Sports venues completed in 2000